DFA Holiday Mix 2005 is a compilation of tracks and remixes by various artists on the dance-punk label The DFA. It was released on October 31, 2005 in the UK and October 25, 2005 in the US.  In the UK it was sold cheaply and was widely available across many record stores.  However, in the US it was only made available in limited quantities from the DFA Records webstore.

Track listing
 "Black Dice - Smiling Off (DFA Mix/Luomo Mix)" – 5:30
 "LCD Soundsystem - Too Much Love (Rub'n'tug Mix)" – 7:03
 "The Juan Maclean – Give Me Every Little Thing (Dub)" – 4:48
 "The Juan Maclean – Tito’s Way (Reverso 68 Mix/Lp Version/Booka Shade Mix)" – 7:42
 "The Juan Maclean – Give Me Every Little Thing (Cajmere Mix/Xpress 2 Bonus Beats/Putsch 79 Disco Dub)" – 4:00
 "Black Dice - ABA (LP Version)" – 2:00
 "Delia Gonzalez & Gavin Russom - #5" – 3:34
 "LCD Soundsystem - Tribulations (Tiga’s Out Of The Trance Closet Mix)" – 7:52
 "LCD Soundsystem - Daft Punk Is Playing At My House (Soulwax Shibuya Mix)" – 5:25

References

Dance-punk albums
DFA Records albums
Record label compilation albums
2005 compilation albums
2005 remix albums
DFA Records compilation albums
DFA Records remix albums